is a Japanese footballer who plays as a defender for Zweigen Kanazawa as a designated special player.

Career statistics

Club

References

External links

2000 births
Living people
Association football people from Saitama Prefecture
Takushoku University alumni
Japanese footballers
Association football defenders
J2 League players
Zweigen Kanazawa players
21st-century Japanese people